Lord George Francis Hamilton  (17 December 1845 – 22 September 1927) was a British Conservative Party politician of the late 19th and early 20th centuries who served as First Lord of the Admiralty and Secretary of State for India.

Background
Hamilton was the third son of James Hamilton, 1st Duke of Abercorn and Lady Louisa, daughter of John Russell, 6th Duke of Bedford, and was educated at Harrow. He served with the Rifle Brigade and Coldstream Guards, achieving the rank of lieutenant.

Political career
Hamilton was Member of Parliament for Middlesex between 1868 and 1885 and for Ealing between 1885 and 1906. He served under Benjamin Disraeli as Under-Secretary of State for India from 1874 to 1878 and as Vice-President of the Committee on Education from 1878 to 1880 and was sworn of the Privy Council in 1878.

He entered the cabinet as First Lord of the Admiralty under Lord Salisbury in 1885, a post he held until 1886 and again between 1886 and 1892. In 1894 he was elected as Chairman of the London School Board, standing down after one year when the Unionists won the general election and he became Secretary of State for India under Salisbury, which he remained until 1903, the last year under the premiership of Arthur Balfour. He was appointed a Knight Grand Commander of the Order of the Star of India (GCSI) in the 1903 Durbar Honours.

In 1916 he was part of the Mesopotamia Commission of Inquiry.

Other public appointments
For a number of years, Hamilton was a member of the board of the Underground Electric Railways Company of London (UERL) which ran the majority of London's Underground lines. He served as the company's chairman between 1915 and 1919, following the resignation of Sir Edgar Speyer in 1915.

Hamilton also held the honorary posts of Captain of Deal Castle (1899–1923) and Major of Deal (1909) and received the degree of honorary LLD from Glasgow University and of honorary DCL from the University of Oxford. He was also a Justice of Peace for Middlesex and Westminster.

He was also President of the Royal Statistical Society from 1910 to 1912 and from 1915 to 1916.

Family and children
Hamilton married Lady Maud Caroline, daughter of Henry Lascelles, 3rd Earl of Harewood, in 1871. They had three sons:

Ronald James Hamilton OBE (1872–1958), who fought in the First World War, was wounded and in 1919 invested an OBE. He was awarded with the decoration of the Order of the Crown (Belgium). He served as First Secretary in the Diplomatic Service. In 1915 he married Florence Marguerite (Sarah Brooke) Hanna (d. 1959). They had one daughter:
Maud Sarah Hamilton (1917–1995). In 1939 she married Squadron Leader Count Manfred Maria Edmund Ralph Beckett Czernin von und zu Chudenitz, DFC, DSO, MC, RAF (1913–1962). With him she had one son and one daughter.
Major Anthony George Hamilton (1874–1936), who fought in the First World War with the East Kent Regiment. He died unmarried and without issue.
Vice-Admiral Robert Cecil Hamilton (1882–1947), who fought in the First World War. In 1911 he married Edith Maud Paley (d. 1967), daughter of the barrister Algernon Herbert Paley.

Hamilton died in September 1927, aged 81. His wife survived him by eleven years and died in April 1938.

Ancestry

References

External links 

 
CricketArchive: Lord George Hamilton
 

1845 births
1927 deaths
People educated at Harrow School
British Secretaries of State
Conservative Party (UK) MPs for English constituencies
Coldstream Guards officers
Rifle Brigade officers
First Lords of the Admiralty
Members of the Privy Council of the United Kingdom
Younger sons of dukes
Presidents of the Royal Statistical Society
UK MPs 1868–1874
UK MPs 1874–1880
UK MPs 1880–1885
UK MPs 1885–1886
UK MPs 1886–1892
UK MPs 1892–1895
UK MPs 1895–1900
UK MPs 1900–1906
Captains of Deal Castle
English cricketers
English cricketers of 1864 to 1889
Marylebone Cricket Club cricketers
People associated with transport in London
Members of the London School Board

Knights Grand Commander of the Order of the Star of India
Recipients of the Order of the Crown (Belgium)
English justices of the peace